Aneroid may refer to:

 Something devoid of liquid
 The village of Aneroid, Saskatchewan
 A type of barometer operated by the movement of the elastic lid of a box exhausted of air